A residential college is a division of a university that places academic activity in a community setting of students and faculty, usually at a residence and with shared meals, the college having a degree of autonomy and a federated relationship with the overall university. The term residential college is also used to describe a variety of other patterns, ranging from a dormitory with some academic programming, to continuing education programs for adults lasting a few days. In some parts of the world it simply refers to any organized on-campus housing, an example being University of Malaya.

Various models of residential college

A prominent model for residential colleges is the colleges of the University of Oxford and University of Cambridge, which are legally-independent constituents of the universities that are both residential and teaching institutions. This model was modified at Durham University, also in the UK, in the 19th century, which adapted the Oxbridge model to create non-teaching colleges that were, depending on the college, legally part of or independent of the University. With the arrival of residential colleges in the United States the model diversified further. The Durham adaptation of colleges being owned by the university rather than being independent corporations is generally followed and many universities, including Yale and Harvard, also follow Durham in keeping teaching centralised.

There is also a split between fully collegiate universities (e.g. the University of Notre Dame, where all freshmen are put in one of the 31 residential colleges) and those (e.g. Northwestern University) where not all students are members of colleges. Another variant at some US universities is residential colleges that do not cover all years at the institute, e.g. Princeton University's system of paired four-year and two-year residential colleges, or Cornell University's West Campus House System, which only takes sophomores and above, with most upperclassmen either living off campus or in dorms unaffiliated with the residential colleges. Another point of variance is whether colleges are multi-disciplinary (as at Oxford and Cambridge) or focused on certain subject areas such as at Fordham University, which has dedicated residential colleges (Integrated Learning Communities) for upperclassmen for various themes including global business and science, as well as separate freshman residential colleges, including one for students considering pre-med or science majors.

The primary difference between a residential college and a dormitory is often considered to be that while a student lives in a dormitory for a year, they are a member of a college for their entire student life, even when not living in the dormitories associated with that college: "Residential colleges are collegia in the original sense: societies, not buildings, and their members may reside anywhere". However, as can be seen above, this is not common to all variants of the residential college system. In addition, the members of a residential college are usually expected to eat their meals together, as a unified body. Standard dormitories tend to have residents who move between dorm complexes every year, and who eat in dining halls largely mixed with residents of other dormitories. However, residential colleges can be self-catering (e.g. Josephine Butler College, Durham), yet still clearly identified as colleges.

United States 
In the United States, as in many collegiate universities in the UK, the academic and residential functions of the residential college system are normally separated, with the colleges primarily as residential and social units. Although residential colleges in some universities offer some classes, these offerings supplement the offerings of the major academic which have separate facilities. Other US institutions not mentioned above that have residential colleges include Binghamton University,Furman University, Murray State University (Murray, KY), Rice University, Washington University in St. Louis, University of Miami, Central Michigan University, Southern Methodist University, the University of Oklahoma, the University of California, San Diego, and the University of California, Santa Cruz. Many other institutions use the system as well. At the University of Virginia, students may apply to live in one of three residential colleges; acceptance rates vary widely. In 2001 Vanderbilt University decided to convert to a residential college system.  Since that time, Vanderbilt has built and renovated residential facilities to suit this program, including The Commons for first-year students and several colleges for upper class students.

United Kingdom and Ireland

Collegiate structures in the British Isles follow a variety of models. In Oxford and Cambridge, a residential college combines both the residential and part of the academic aspects of the university in one location. Tutorials (Oxford) or Supervisions (Cambridge) are generally given within the college, but lectures are organised by the wider university. In most universities in the UK with residential colleges – Durham (from the 19th century) along with Kent, Lancaster and York (from the 1960s) – formal teaching is carried out only in academic departments. Their colleges are primarily residential and the focus for social and sporting activities, as well as for student welfare. In these universities, the colleges are (with the exception of two early 20th century colleges at Durham) owned by their parent university; this is also the case for three of the newer colleges at Oxford, which are formally "societies" of the university. The University of Roehampton has four colleges (all founded in the 19th century) that joined to form the University. The teaching of the University takes place within the colleges, with academic departments being associated with a particular college. Roehampton colleges are, therefore, both residential and academic, but with the academic organisation on very different lines from Oxford and Cambridge. The University of London and the University of the Highlands and Islands are federal universities whose colleges are independent teaching institutes (some, in the case of London, being essentially world-leading universities in their own right) rather than residential colleges. The University of the Arts London is similarly organised, with six constituent teaching colleges, except that these are all owned by the central University rather than being joined in a federal structure. The University of Dublin (founded 1592) in Ireland has only one constituent college, Trinity College, Dublin, which is thus effectively the whole University rather than a residential college. The University of St Andrews in Scotland contains three colleges, but these have neither a teaching nor residential role.

Canada
Many universities in Canada have collegiate systems similar to those in British collegiate universities. For instance, the University of Toronto and York University have a well-established collegiate system including a number of "federated colleges" and "constituent colleges". Initially, the University of Victoria maintained a system of residential colleges (including Craigdarroch College and Lansdowne College) built around central courtyards, before adopting a more centralized residential system which is now made up of Permanent Halls (eg., Ring Road Hall) and Common Rooms. Other Canadian universities with residential colleges include the University of Waterloo, the University of Western Ontario, the University of Manitoba, the University of British Columbia, Trent University and its colleges, Paton College at Memorial University of Newfoundland. Three Canadian residential colleges are distinguished by being for graduate students rather than undergraduates — Green College, Vancouver and St. John's College, Vancouver colleges at UBC, and Massey College, Toronto at the University of Toronto.

Australia
In Australia, colleges perform different functions at different universities. Colleges at the University of Melbourne and the University of Sydney provide academic, sporting and cultural programs in addition to those offered by their parent institution. However, they only serve a small fraction of the university population. By point of comparison, the colleges at the Australian National University and Monash University focus on the provision of accommodation.

New Zealand 
Residential colleges or Halls of Residence in New Zealand are common across the country's universities, particular for housing first year students. University of Auckland has 6 Halls, while University of Otago in Dunedin has a particular strong set of colleges modelled on the Oxbridge system. Each of Otago's 15 colleges has its own distinctive 'personality', history, and traditions.

India

Established in 1916, Banaras Hindu University is India's first residential university in India. It is also the largest residential university in Asia. Pantnagar University is another example of a residential college.

Italy

In Italy, the residential college model was adopted in 2003 by all of Milan universities, according to a joint program developed in collaboration with several private and public institutions, such as Microsoft and the Lombardy Region, at the Collegio di Milano.

South Korea
In South Korea, the residential college system was first adopted by Wonju campus of Yonsei University in 2007 and later extended to Songdo campus in 2013. Due to the lack of housing available to the students, only the freshmen year participate in the residential college.  Wonju campus operates 7 houses and the residential college campus in Songdo operates 12 houses.

There is another residential college in GIST(Gwangju Institute of Science and Technology) College at Gwangju, South Korea. The house system is a dormitory system being implemented at Caltech, Harvard, etc. in which a number of small-scale residential communities are formed within the dormitories to link studies and life together. GIST College has gained positive outcomes in undergraduate students’ dormitory life as well as university life as a whole.

See also
 List of residential colleges
 University college
 Collegiate university
 House system
 Colleges within universities in the United Kingdom

References

External links
  A portal featuring related information, news, and links about the residential college idea.
  Appears to be off-line as of 2007-01-02.
  "A world-wide association of university colleges" – promotes residential colleges and organises academic conferences

Types of university or college
University and college residential buildings